Take Me Higher is the twenty-first studio album by American singer Diana Ross, released on September 5, 1995, by Motown Records. Ross' first regular studio release in four years, following The Force Behind the Power (1991) and the holiday album A Very Special Season (1994), the album features work from urban producers such as G Syier Hawkins Brown, Narada Michael Walden, Mike Mani, Louis Biancaniello, Jon-John and the Babyface protégés, The Boom Brothers.

The album peaked at number 10 on the UK Albums Chart and entered the top forty in Austria and Scotland as well as on the US Top R&B/Hip-Hop Albums. Take Me Higher yielded several singles, including the UK hits "Take Me Higher", "Gone" and Ross' dance cover of Gloria Gaynor's disco anthem "I Will Survive" (1978). Photographer Ruven Afanador shot the album cover and the fashion forward video shoot which Ross used for promotional purposes. He also shot the video compilation for the single, "Don't Stop".

Critical reception

In a retrospective review for AllMusic, editor William Ruhlmann wrote that "combining the work of four separate producers who mostly tried to fit Ross into contemporary dance trends, the album did feature a club bit in the title song, while the ballad "Gone" made the Top 40 in the UK. But Ross herself seemed to have spent more time posing for the many fashion shots in the booklet than singing  pedestrian songs." Vibe critic Elysa Gardner found that Take Me Higher was "mired in excess. There are too many collaborators, too much synthetic production and heavy-handed sentiment [...] the only palpable vision is a firm eye on the middle of the road."

Chart performance
In the United Kingdom, Take Me Higher debuted and peaked at number 10 on the UK Albums Chart, becoming Ross' first top ten studio album since Diana Ross (1976). Elsewhere, it entered the top forty in Austria and Scotland, reaching number 40 and number 37, respectively. In the United States, Take Me Higher underperformed, peaking at 114 on the US Billboard 200 and number 38 on the US Top R&B/Hip-Hop Albums, while selling a little over 100,000 copies.

Singles
Title track and lead single "Take Me Higher" became a hit on the dance charts, reaching number four on the UK Dance Singles, while topping the US Dance Club Songs. Follow-up "Gone" became Ross' fourth top 40 entry in the UK, while "If You're Not Gonna Love Me Right" reached number 67 on the US Hot R&B/Hip-Hop Songs. "Voice of the Heart" peaked at number 28 on the US Adult Contemporary, with "I Will Survive," Ross' cover of the Gloria Gaynor song, reached number 14 in the UK Singles Chart. Her version got an extra boost from being played at a key scene in Frank Oz's American comedy film, In & Out (1997). Ross also performed it during a "Take Me Higher" megamix at her acclaimed Super Bowl XXX Half-Time show as she was whisked away in a helicopter.

Track listing

Notes
 signifies an associate producer
 signifies an co-producer

Charts

References

1995 albums
Motown albums
Diana Ross albums
Albums produced by Narada Michael Walden
Hip hop soul albums